Prosopocoilus bison is a beetle of the family Lucanidae.

Subspecies 
 Prosopocoilus bison bison
 Prosopocoilus bison buruensis
 Prosopocoilus bison hortensis
 Prosopocoilus bison magnificus
 Prosopocoilus bison tesserarius

Lucaninae
Prosopocoilus
Beetles described in 1789